The 2012 Asian Air Gun Championships were held in Nanchang, China between December 12 and December 18, 2012.

Medal summary

Men

Women

Medal table

References 
General
 ISSF Results Overview

Specific

External links 
 Official Results

Asian Shooting Championships
Asian
Shooting
2012 in Chinese sport
Shooting competitions in China
Sport in Nanchang